The name Adhil  has been applied to a number of stars, especially in the constellation of Andromeda. It is the name approved by the International Astronomical Union for Xi Andromedae.

Origin 
Adhil was originally applied to the description of Ptolemy's 21st and 22nd of Andromeda in his star catalogue in Latin translated version of Almagest.

Etymology
Adhil is a lingua franca term from an Arabic phrase الذيل al-dhayl [að-ðáil] meaning "the train [of a garment]" (literally "the tail").

Identification
There are two kind of the identification of Ptolemy's 21st and 22nd of Andromeda.

Renaissance times 
However Bayer gave Adhil for 60/b And in his prominent work Uranometria in 1603, and Bode followed Bayer in his great star atlas Uranographia in 1801.

Recent times 
Adhil is applied to Xi Andromedae from Manitius' identification of Ptolemy's 21st of Andromeda.

See also 
 Xi Andromedae (recent Adhil)
 60 Andromedae (Bayer and Bode's Adhil)
 49 Andromedae (one of adhil in the Almagest)
 Chi Andromedae (one of adhil in the Almagest)
 Syrma (Iota Virginis)

Notes 

Andromeda (constellation)